Das große Kleinkunstfestival is a theatre festival in Berlin, Germany.

Rundfunk Berlin-Brandenburg
Theatre festivals in Berlin